Kyushu Mountains is a mountain range that runs from northeast to southwest in central Kyushu. 

The highest peak of the mountain range is Mount Sobo.

References 

Mountain ranges of Japan
Geography of the Kyushu region